Ayankudi  is a village in the  
Aranthangi revenue block of Pudukkottai district, Tamil Nadu, India.

Demographics 

As per the 2001 census, Ayankudi had a total population of  3450 with 1661 males and 1789 females. Out of the total population, 12,534 people were literate.

References

Villages in Pudukkottai district